"Show You Love" is a song written and performed by Jars of Clay. It was the first single from their 2003 studio album, Who We Are Instead. The song was prominently featured in the Adam Sandler motion picture, Spanglish. The song was featured at the end of an episode of The WB television series Summerland, as well as in an episode of the UPN series Kevin Hill. This song also appears on the WOW Hits 2005 compilation album, and the 2008 greatest hits album Jars of Clay: Greatest Hits.

Track listing
"Show You Love" - 3:32 (Charlie Lowell, Dan Haseltine, Matt Odmark, & Stephen Mason)

Performance credits
Dan Haseltine - vocals
Charlie Lowell - piano, organ, background vocals
Stephen Mason - guitars, background vocals
Matt Odmark - guitars, background vocals
Chris McHugh - drums
Aaron Sands - bass

Technical credits
Ron Aniello - producer, recording
David Thoener - recording
Clint Roth - recording
Richard Dodd - mastering
Jacquire King - recording, additional engineering, mixing
Sang Park - mixing assistant, recording assistant
Mike Paragone - recording assistant
Robert Beeson - executive producer

Charts
 No. 1 Christian CHR
 No. 5 Christian AC

Awards

On 2005, the song was nominated for a Dove Award for Rock Recorded Song of the Year at the 36th GMA Dove Awards.

References

External links
Official music video on YouTube

2003 singles
Jars of Clay songs
Songs written by Dan Haseltine
Songs written by Charlie Lowell
Songs written by Stephen Mason (musician)
Songs written by Matt Odmark
Song recordings produced by Ron Aniello
2003 songs
Essential Records (Christian) singles